The tepui brushfinch (Atlapetes personatus) is a species of bird in the family Passerellidae.

It is found in the tepuis of Brazil, Guyana, and Venezuela. Its natural habitat is subtropical or tropical moist montane forest between 1,000 and 2,500 meters elevation.

References

Atlapetes
Birds described in 1848
Taxonomy articles created by Polbot
Birds of the Tepuis